Universal Circulating Herald (1874–1947) was the first Chinese-language newspaper in history.  It was founded February 5, 1874, by Wang Tao in Hong Kong.  Wang Tao, who was an advocate for institutional changes by the Qing government, rather than the purely military and technological devices promoted by the "self-strengthening" school, published these ideas in the Universal Circulating Herald. 
 
These reformist ideas could have influenced Sun Yat-sen, who went on, in 1890–1892, to make reformist proposals to two progressive government officials, Cheng Tsao-ju (a scholar of Sun's native Chinese county of Heungshan and a prominent and progressive official who had served as Chinese Minister to the United States between 1881 and 1885) and Cheng Kuan-ying.

See also
 List of newspapers in Hong Kong

References 

Defunct newspapers published in Hong Kong
Publications established in 1874